The Tiger II is a German heavy tank of the Second World War. The final official German designation was Panzerkampfwagen Tiger Ausf. B, often shortened to Tiger B. The ordnance inventory designation was Sd.Kfz. 182. (Sd.Kfz. 267 and 268 for command vehicles). It was also known informally as the Königstiger (German for Bengal tiger and also, literally, "King Tiger"). Contemporaneous Allied soldiers usually called it the King Tiger or Royal Tiger.

The Tiger II was the successor to the Tiger I, combining the latter's thick armour with the armour sloping used on the Panther medium tank. It was armed with the long barrelled 8.8 cm KwK 43 L/71 anti-tank cannon. The chassis was also the basis for the Jagdtiger turretless Jagdpanzer anti-tank vehicle.

The Tiger II was issued to heavy tank battalions of the Army and the Waffen-SS. It was first used in combat by 503rd Heavy Panzer Battalion during the Allied invasion of Normandy on 11 July 1944; on the Eastern Front, the first unit to be outfitted with the Tiger II was the 501st Heavy Panzer Battalion, which by 1 September 1944 listed 25 Tiger IIs operational.

Development

Development of a heavy tank design had been initiated in 1937; the initial design contract was awarded to Henschel. Another design contract followed in 1939, and was given to Porsche. Both prototype series used the same turret design from Krupp; the main differences were in the hull, transmission, suspension and automotive features.

The Henschel version used a conventional hull design with sloped armour resembling the layout of the Panther tank. It had a rear-mounted engine and used nine steel-tired, eighty-centimeter-diameter overlapping road wheels per side with internal springing, mounted on transverse torsion bars, in a similar manner to the original Henschel-designed Tiger I. To simplify maintenance, however, as when the same steel-tired road wheels were used on later Tiger I hulls, the wheels were only overlapping without being interleaved—the full Schachtellaufwerk rubber-rimmed road-wheel system that had been in use on nearly all German half-tracks used the interleaved design, later inherited by the early production versions of the Tiger I and Panther.

The Porsche hull designs included a rear-mounted turret and a mid-mounted engine. The suspension was the same as on the Elefant tank destroyer. This had six road wheels per side mounted in paired bogies sprung with short longitudinal torsion bars that were integral to the wheel pair; this saved internal space and facilitated repairs. One Porsche version had a gasoline-electric drive (fundamentally identical to a Diesel-electric transmission, only using a gasoline-fueled engine as the prime mover), similar to a gasoline-electric hybrid but without a storage battery; two separate drivetrains in parallel, one per side of the tank, each consisting of a hybrid drive train; gasoline engine–electric generator–electric motor–drive sprocket. This method of propulsion had been attempted before on the rejected Tiger (P) (which had been rebuilt as Elefant ) and in some US designs and was put into production in the World War I era Saint-Chamond tank and the post-World War I FCM Char 2C. The Porsche suspension components were later used on a few of the later Jagdtiger tank destroyers. Another proposal was to use hydraulic drives; Dr. Porsche's unorthodox designs gathered little favour.

Design

Henschel won the design contract, and all Tiger IIs were produced by the firm. Two turret designs were used in production vehicles. The initial design is often misleadingly called  the "Porsche" turret due to the misbelief that it was designed by Porsche for their Tiger II prototype; in fact it was the initial Krupp design for both prototypes. This turret had a rounded front and steeply sloped sides, with a difficult-to-manufacture curved bulge on the turret's left side to accommodate the commander's cupola. Fifty early turrets were mounted to Henschel hulls and used in action. In December 1943 the more common "production" turret, sometimes erroneously called the "Henschel" turret, was simplified with a significantly thicker flat face (which eliminated the shot trap caused by the curved face of the earlier turret), and less-steeply sloped sides, which avoided the need for a bulge for the commander's cupola, and added additional room for ammunition storage.

The turrets were designed to mount the 8.8 cm KwK 43 L/71 gun. Combined with the Turmzielfernrohr 9d (German "turret telescopic sight") monocular sight by Leitz, which all but a few early Tiger IIs used, it was a very accurate and deadly weapon. Recorded combat performance was lower, but still over 80 percent at 1,000 m, in the 60s at 1,500 m and the 40s at 2,000 m. The Sprenggranate 43 (SpGr) high-explosive round was available for soft targets, or the Hohlgranate or Hohlgeschoss 39 (HlGr – HEAT or High-explosive anti-tank warhead) round, which had  penetration at any range, could be used as a dual-purpose munition against soft or armoured targets.

Powered turret traverse was provided by the variable speed Boehringer-Sturm L4S hydraulic motor, which was driven from the main engine by a secondary drive shaft. A high and a low speed setting was available to the gunner via a lever on his right. The turret could be rotated 360 degrees at 6º/second in low gear independent of engine rpm, at 19º/second – the same as with the Tiger I – with the high speed setting and engine at 2000 rpm, and over 36º/second at the maximum allowable engine speed of 3000 rpm. The direction and speed of traverse was controlled by the gunner through pedals, or a control lever near his left arm. This system allowed for very precise control of powered traverse, a light touch on the pedal resulting in a minimum traverse speed of 0.1 deg/sec (360 degrees in 60 min), unlike in most other tanks of the time (e.g. US M4 Sherman or Soviet T-34) this allowed for fine laying of the gun without the gunner needing to use his traverse handwheel. If power was lost, such as when the tank ran out of fuel, the turret could be slowly traversed by hand, assisted by the loader who had an additional wheel, which could manually rotate the turret at a rate of one-half a degree per each revolution of the hand crank; a 20° turret rotation required 40 full cranks of the handwheel, and to turn the turret a full 360° the gunner would be required to crank the handwheel 720 full revolutions.

Like all German tanks, the Tiger II had a petrol engine; in this case the same 700 PS (690 hp, 515 kW) V-12 Maybach HL 230 P30 which powered the much lighter Panther and Tiger I tanks. The Tiger II was under-powered, like many other heavy tanks of World War II, and consumed a lot of fuel, which was in short supply for the Germans. The transmission was the Maybach OLVAR OG 40 12 16 Model B, giving eight forward gears and four reverse, which drove the steering gear. This was the Henschel L 801, a double radius design which proved susceptible to failure. Transverse torsion bar suspension supported the hull on nine axles per side. Overlapped  diameter road wheels with rubber cushions and steel tyres rode inside the tracks.

Like the Tiger I, each tank was issued with two sets of tracks: a normal "battle track" and a narrower "transport" version used during rail movement. The transport tracks reduced the overall width of the load and could be used to drive the tank short distances on firm ground. The crew were expected to change to normal battle tracks as soon as the tank was unloaded. Ground pressure was 0.76 kg/cm2 (10.8 psi).

Command variant
The command variant of the Tiger II was designated Panzerbefehlswagen Tiger Ausf. B. It had two versions, Sd.Kfz. 267 and Sd.Kfz. 268. These carried only 63 rounds of 8.8 cm ammunition to provide room to accommodate the extra radios and equipment, and had additional armour on the engine compartment. The Sd.Kfz. 267 was to have used FuG 8 and FuG 5 radio sets, with the most notable external changes being a  rod antenna mounted on the turret roof and a Sternantenne D ("Star antenna D"), mounted on an insulated base (the 105 mm Antennenfuß Nr. 1), which was protected by a large armoured cylinder. This equipment was located on the rear decking in a position originally used for deep-wading equipment. The Sd.Kfz. 268 used FuG 7 and FuG 5 radios with a two-metre rod antenna mounted on the turret roof and a 1.4 metre rod antenna mounted on the rear deck.

Production
The Tiger II was developed late in the war and built in relatively small numbers. Orders were placed for 1,500 Tiger IIs—slightly more than the 1,347 Tiger I tanks produced—but production was severely disrupted by Allied bombing raids. Among others, five raids between 22 September and 7 October 1944 destroyed 95 percent of the floor area of the Henschel plant. It is estimated that this caused the loss in production of some 657 Tiger IIs. Only 492 units were produced: one in 1943, 379 in 1944, and 112 in 1945. Full production ran from mid-1944 to the end of the war. Each Tiger II produced needed 300,000 man hours to manufacture and cost over 800,000 Reichsmark or US$300,000 per vehicle. The vehicle was the costliest German tank to produce at the time.

The Tiger II served as the basis for one production variant, the Jagdtiger casemated tank destroyer, and a proposed Grille 17/21/30/42 self-propelled mount for heavy guns which never reached production.

Proposed upgrades
The Maybach HL234, an engine born from the developments initiated by attempting to convert the Maybach HL230 to fuel injection, would have increased the power from 700 to at least 800 PS (hp). In January 1945 the Entwicklungskommission Panzer unanimously decided that HL234 be immediately included in the engine design and procurement program. The ZF AK-7-200 gearbox was also explored as an alternative to the Maybach Olvar-B semi-automatic gearbox, but Waffenamt research and development department Wa Prüf 6 found that it offered inferior driving characteristics and so the Maybach Olvar-B was retained. There was also a program using the Simmering-Graz-Pauker Sla.16-cylinder diesel engine, but the war's constraint on supplies and capitulation resulted in the cancellation of this program. Krupp proposed mounting a new main weapon, the 10.5 cm KwK L/68. Wa Prüf 6 was not supportive of this as the Heer had not accepted the cannon itself. Other suggested improvements included stabilised sights, a stabilised main gun, an automatic ammunition feed (often known as an auto loader), a Carl Zeiss AG stereoscopic rangefinder, heated crew compartment, stowage  for an additional 12 rounds, and an overpressure and air filtration system to protect against poison gas. However, these also never got beyond the proposal stage or did not enter production before the war ended.

Specifications
 Gearbox: Maybach OLVAR OG 40 12 16 B (eight forward and four reverse)
 Radio: FuG 5, Befehlswagen (command tank) version: FuG 8 (Sd.Kfz. 267), FuG 7 (Sd.Kfz. 268)
 Ammunition: 
 8.8 cm – 80 rounds (early turret), 86 rounds (main production turret), usually 50% PzGr 39/43 and 50% SprGr 43, sometimes with a limited number of PzGr 40/43, or with the SprGr replaced by HlGr
 PzGr 39/43 (Armour-piercing, hardened steel) (longer range, lower penetration, explosive filler)
 PzGr 40/43 (Armour-piercing, tungsten carbide core) (shorter range, higher penetration, inert)
 SprGr 43 (High explosive)
 HlGr 39 (Hollow charge)
 7.92mm – up to 5,850 rounds
 Gun Sight: Turmzielfernrohr 9b/1 (TZF 9b/1) binocular to May 1944, then the 9d (TZF 9d) monocular.

Operational history

Organisation

Apart from research, training, and a five-tank attachment to the Panzer Lehr, the Tiger II was only issued to heavy tank battalions (schwere Panzer-Abteilungen) of the German Army (Heer), or Waffen-SS.

A standard battalion (Abteilung) comprised 45 tanks:

Units that used the Tiger II were as follows:
Heer: (s.H.Pz.Abt) 501, 502, 503, 504, 505, 506, 507, 508, 509, 510, 511
SS: (s.SS.Pz.Abt) 501, 502, 503

Reliability and mobility

Early Tiger IIs proved unreliable, owing principally to leaking seals and gaskets, an overburdened drive train originally intended for a lighter vehicle, and teething problems with the final drive and steering unit; both of which had been newly designed for the Tiger II. The final drive unit and the double radius steering gear were initially particularly prone to failures. Henschel's chief designer, Erwin Aders, said, "The failure occurred because the Tiger II went into production without considering the test results." Lack of crew training could amplify this problem; drivers originally given only limited training on other tanks were often sent directly to operational units already on their way to the front.

The Schwere Heeres Panzer Abteilung 501 (s.H.Pz.Abt. 501) arrived on the Eastern Front with only eight out of 45 tanks operational; these faults were mostly due to final drive failures. The first five Tiger IIs delivered to the Panzer Lehr Division broke down before they could be used in combat, and were destroyed to prevent capture.

Henschel worked closely with crews to solve the mechanical problems, and with the introduction of modified seals, gaskets and drive train components, as well as improved driver training and sufficient maintenance, the Tiger II could be maintained in a satisfactory operational condition. Statistics from 15 March 1945 show reliability rates of 59 percent for the Tiger, almost equal to the 62 percent of the Panzer IV and better than the 48 percent of the Panther that were operational by this period. 

The s.H.Pz.Abt 503 noted in an after-action report during operations in Hungary, November 1944:

Notwithstanding its initial reliability problems, the Tiger II was remarkably agile for such a heavy vehicle. Contemporary German records and testing results indicate that its tactical mobility was as good as or better than most German or Allied tanks.

Combat history

The first combat use of the Tiger II was by the 1st Company of the 503rd Heavy Panzer Battalion (s.H.Pz.Abt. 503) during the Battle of Normandy, opposing Operation Atlantic between Troarn and Demouville on 18 July 1944. Two were lost in combat, while the company commander's tank became irrecoverably trapped after falling into a bomb crater created during Operation Goodwood.

On the Eastern Front, it was first used on 12 August 1944 by the 501st Heavy Panzer Battalion (s.H.Pz.Abt. 501) resisting the Lvov–Sandomierz Offensive. It attacked the Soviet bridgehead over the Vistula River near Baranów Sandomierski. On the road to Oględów, three Tiger IIs were destroyed in an ambush by a few T-34-85s. Because these German tanks suffered ammunition explosions, which caused many crew fatalities, main gun rounds were no longer allowed to be stowed within the turret, reducing capacity to 68. Up to fourteen Tiger IIs of the 501st were destroyed or captured in the area between 11 and 14 August to ambushes and flank attacks by both Soviet T-34-85 and IS-2 tanks, and ISU-122 assault guns in inconvenient sandy terrain. The capture of three operational Tiger IIs allowed the Soviets to conduct tests at Kubinka and to evaluate its strengths and weaknesses

On 15 October 1944, Tiger IIs of 503rd Heavy Panzer Battalion played a crucial role during Operation Panzerfaust, supporting Otto Skorzeny's troops in taking the Hungarian capital of Budapest, which ensured that the country remained with the Axis until the end of the war. The 503rd then took part in the Battle of Debrecen. The 503rd remained in the Hungarian theater of operations for 166 days, during which time it accounted for at least 121 Soviet tanks, 244 anti-tank guns and artillery pieces, five aircraft and a train. This was set against the loss of 25 Tiger IIs; ten were knocked out by Soviet troops and burned out, two were sent back to Vienna for a factory overhaul, while thirteen were blown up by their crews for various reasons, usually to prevent them from falling into enemy hands.

The Tiger II was also used in significant numbers, distributed into four heavy panzer battalions, during the Ardennes Offensive (also known as the 'Battle of the Bulge') of December 1944. At least 150 Tiger IIs were present, nearly a third of total production; most were lost over the course of the offensive.

Some Tiger IIs were also present during the Soviet Vistula–Oder and East Prussian Offensives in January 1945, as well as the German Lake Balaton Offensive in Hungary in March 1945, the Battle of the Seelow Heights in April 1945, and the Battle of Berlin at the end of the war.

The 103rd SS Heavy Panzer Battalion (s.SS Pz.Abt. 503) claimed approximately 500 kills in the period from January to April 1945 on the Eastern Front for the loss of 45 Tiger IIs (most of which were abandoned and destroyed by their own crews after mechanical breakdowns or for lack of fuel).

Gun and armour performance

The heavy armour and powerful long-range gun gave the Tiger II an advantage against all opposing Western Allied and Soviet tanks attempting to engage it from head on. This was especially true on the Western Front where, until the arrival of the few M26 Pershings in 1945 and the few M4A3E2 Sherman "Jumbo" assault tanks with additional armour (and after February 1945 some with high velocity 76 mm gun ) that were scattered around Europe after D-Day, as well as a few late Churchill models, neither the British nor US forces brought heavy tanks into service. A Wa Prüf 1 report estimated that the Tiger II's frontal aspect was impervious to the Soviet 122 mm D-25T, the largest calibre tank gun of the war. However, Soviet testing contradicted this as they found that the frontal glacis could be destroyed by firing 3–4 shots at the weld joints from the ranges of 500–600m which were found to be inferior in quality to that of previous German designs like the Tiger I or Panther. An R.A.C 3.d. document of February 1945 estimated that the British (76.2 mm) QF 17-pounder gun, using armour-piercing discarding sabot shot was theoretically capable of penetrating the front of the Tiger II's turret and nose (lower front hull) at  respectively although, given the lack of a stated angle, this was presumably at the ideal 90 degrees and in combat the Tiger II was never penetrated frontally by the QF 17-Pounder.

As a result of its thick frontal armour, flanking manoeuvres were most often used against the Tiger II to attempt a shot at the thinner side and rear armour, giving a tactical advantage to the Tiger II in most engagements. Moreover, the main armament of the Tiger II was capable of knocking out any Allied tank frontally at ranges exceeding , well beyond the effective range of Allied tank guns.

Soviet wartime testing

During August 1944, two Tiger Ausf B tanks were captured by the Soviets near Sandomierz, and were soon moved to the testing grounds at Kubinka. During the transfer, the two tanks suffered from various mechanical breakdowns; the cooling system was insufficient for the excessively hot weather, where the engine tended to overheat and cause a consequential failure of the gearbox. The right suspension of one of the tanks had to be completely replaced, and its full functionality could not be re-established. The tank broke down again every 10–15 km. The 8.8 cm KwK 43 gave positive results in penetration and accuracy, which were on par with the 122 mm D-25T. It proved capable of passing completely through its "colleague", a Tiger Ausf B's turret at a range of 400 m. The armour of one vehicle was tested by firing at it with shells between 100 and 152 mm calibre. The welding was, despite careful workmanship, significantly worse than on similar designs. As a result, even when shells did not penetrate the armour, there was often a large amount of spalling from the inside of the plates, which damaged the transmission and rendered the tank inoperable. Further testing showed that the armour plate itself exhibited deficiencies in quality compared to earlier German tanks such as the Tiger I and Panther. Lab testing found that the armour plates lacked molybdenum (ascribed to a loss of supply, being replaced by vanadium), resulting in low malleability.

The expanded firing test states that the АР projectiles from the 100 mm BS-3 and 122 mm A-19 gun penetrated a Tiger Ausf B's turret at ranges of 1000–1500 metres, which suggests a quality factor of 0.86 for the Tiger Ausf B's turret. The firing test against the Tiger B turret front, however, was conducted after removal of the gun and mantlet, and resulted in penetrations close to armour openings, such as vision slits and gun location. The penetrations to the right gun opening were influenced by previous 100 mm projectile penetration hits or armour damage. The 100 mm BS-3 and 122 mm A-19 could also penetrate the weld joints of the front hull at ranges of 500–600 metres after 3–4 shots.

Surviving vehicles

The only working example is displayed at the Musée des Blindés, Saumur, France. It has the production turret and is accessible to the public. This tank belonged to the 1st Company, 101st SS Heavy Panzer Battalion. It was believed to have been abandoned by its crew on 23 August 1944, due to engine problems, at Brueil-en-Vexin, near Mantes-la-Jolie. It was salvaged by the French Army in September 1944 and then stored in a factory in Satory before being transferred to the museum in 1975. It was believed to have had turret number 123, but Colonel Michel Aubry, the founder of the museum, decided to put 233 on the turret in honour of the Tiger II that destroyed his Sherman tank at the end of the war. Unlike other captured German vehicles, this Tiger II was never used by the French Army.
Other survivors include:

 The Tank Museum, Dorset, UK. Tiger II with early production turret is on display. This vehicle was the second soft steel prototype made and did not see active service. This Tiger II's engine was removed for use in the restoration of Tiger 131, the only working example of a Tiger I. This item is currently on display at Nationaal Militair Museum, in Soesterberg, Netherlands. A production turret Tiger II is on loan from the Defence Academy, Shrivenham, UK.
 Defence Academy of the United Kingdom, Shrivenham, UK. Tiger II (production turret). This vehicle was from s.SS Pz.Abt. 501, with hull number 280093, turret number 104, and has a comprehensive coating of Zimmerit. It was claimed by Sergeant Roberts of A Squadron, 23rd Hussars, 11th Armoured Division in a Sherman tank near Beauvais, although it had already been disabled and abandoned by its crew following damage to its tracks and final drive. There is a photograph showing this vehicle after its final action in a beet field with its turret turned 90°. This item is currently on display at The Tank Museum, in Dorset, UK.
 The Wheatcroft Collection, Leicestershire, UK. A private collector, Kevin Wheatcroft, is about to start a restoration/rebuild of a complete Tiger II. The project will include parts from many individual Tiger IIs, but many parts will be of new manufacture. Wheatcroft has stated that he has 70–80% of the original parts needed for a reconstruction and more parts are sourced continuously. Known and shown parts are a complete front glacis plate, 8.8 cm KwK 43 main armament, engine deck plates, approx. 1/3 hull (rear) in one part, a set of tracks, and approx. 2/3 of the left-side hull plate in two parts. The aim of the project is a complete Tiger II in running order.

 Deutsches Panzermuseum, Munster, Germany. Tiger II (production turret) displayed in interior location accessible to public on payment of entrance fee. Hull number 280101. Originally bearing turret number 121 from s.SS.Pz.Abt 501 it was restored with a different number for unknown reasons.
 Mantes-la-Jolie, France. A more or less complete, but wrecked, Tiger II (production turret) is buried under regional road 913. Parts of the turret were recovered in a limited exploratory excavation in 2001. Further excavation is currently halted for financial reasons. There are plans to fully excavate and restore this Tiger II for a Vexin battle memorial.
 Kubinka Tank Museum, Russia. Tiger II (production turret) with turret number 002 (502) captured at Oględów by the Red Army. The museum is open to the public.

 December 44 Museum, La Gleize, Belgium. A cosmetically restored Tiger II (production turret) Hull number 280273, built in October 1944. Turret number 213 from s.SS Pz.Abt 501. Displayed at the entrance to DECEMBER 44 MUSEUM Collections, a museum devoted entirely to the Battle of the Bulge. This tank was abandoned in La Gleize on 24 December 1944, where the advance of Kampfgruppe Peiper was halted. The front part, about 1/3, of the gun barrel is restored with a Panther gun barrel and muzzle brake. It also has restored mudguards. It is stripped of exterior and internal fittings and most of the torsion bars are broken, but it still has its gearbox and engine in place.

 National Armor & Cavalry Heritage Museum, Restoration Shop, Fort Benning, GA, United States. Tiger II (production turret). Hull number 280243, built in September 1944. Turret number 332 from s.SS Pz.Abt. 501. Captured during the Battle of the Bulge by Sgt. Glenn D. George of the 740th Tank Battalion of the 1st US Army on December 24, 1944. The left side was cut open for educational purposes at the Aberdeen Proving Ground in the late 1940s. Was on display at the former "Patton Museum of Cavalry & Armor, Fort Knox KY, then under BRAC transferred to Fort Benning.
 Schweizerisches Militärmuseum Full, Switzerland. This Tiger II (production turret) was previously displayed in the Thun Tank Museum, and is now on loan to the Schweizerisches Militärmuseum Full (September 2006). This tank was given to Switzerland by France after the war. Hull number 280215 from s.H.Pz.Abt 506. As of 2021, it is in the process of being restored to working order.

See also
 List of military vehicles of World War II
 List of World War II military vehicles of Germany
 List of Sd.Kfz. designations
 List of WWII Maybach engines

Tanks of comparable role, performance and era

 British Black Prince heavy tank - six prototypes built in May 1945; did not enter service
 Soviet IS-2 model 1944 heavy assault tank - entered service in 1944
 Soviet IS-3 heavy tank - entered service in 1945
 United States T32 heavy tank - prototype; did not enter service
 United States M26 Pershing heavy tank
 United States T29 heavy tank - prototype; did not enter service
 United States M6A2E1 heavy tank - prototype; did not enter service
 French ARL 44 - produced and served in limited numbers in the late 1940s and early 1950s
 French AMX-50 - several prototypes produced in the late 1940s and early 1950s

References
Informational notes

Citations

Bibliography

External links
 Information about the Pz.Kpfw.Tiger Ausf.B "Tiger II" at Panzerworld
 Tiger II at the Armorsite
 Pantiger, A Redesigned Tiger (U.S. intelligence report, 1944)

Heavy tanks of Germany
World War II heavy tanks
World War II tanks of Germany
History of the tank
Military vehicles introduced from 1940 to 1944